Dennis Patrick Lloyd (born 1 December 1948) is a former New Zealand cricketer who played first-class and List A cricket for Northern Districts from 1968 to 1981.

Dennis Lloyd was a batsman who often opened the innings. His highest first-class score was 103 against Canterbury in 1968–69. In a semi-final of the List A competition in 1977-78 he opened the batting for Northern Districts and made 34 not out as he and Barry Roberts successfully chased Auckland's total of 70 without losing a wicket.

He also played Hawke Cup cricket for Northland from 1967 to 1985. He opened the batting in the team that won the title in 1982–83, top-scoring with 88 in the victory over Nelson. In all he played more than 100 matches for Northland.

References

External links
 
 Dennis Lloyd at CricketArchive

1948 births
Living people
New Zealand cricketers
Northern Districts cricketers
Cricketers from Auckland